Boomtime may refer to:

The day of the week in the Discordian calendar
The book by James H. Gray
The episode of the television documentary People's Century
The track by the alternative rock band Amplifier